Zināʾ or zinā ( or ) is an Islamic legal term referring to unlawful sexual intercourse. According to traditional jurisprudence, zina can include adultery, fornication, prostitution, rape, sodomy, incest, and bestiality. Zina must be proved by testimony of four Muslim eyewitnesses to the actual act of penetration, or a confession repeated four times and not retracted later. The offenders must have acted of their own free will. Rapists could be prosecuted under different legal categories which used normal evidentiary rules. Making an accusation of zina without presenting the required eyewitnesses is called qadhf, which is itself a hudud offense.

There are very few recorded examples of the stoning penalty for zinā being implemented legally. Prior to legal reforms introduced in several countries during the 20th century, the procedural requirements for proving the offense of zinā to the standard necessary to impose the stoning penalty were effectively impossible to meet.

Zina became a more pressing issue in modern times, as Islamist movements and governments employed polemics against public immorality. In recent decades several countries passed legal reforms that incorporated elements of hudud laws into their legal codes, and many modern Islamists have also disregarded the condition of strict evidence requirements. In Nigeria, local courts have passed several stoning sentences, all of which were overturned on appeal or left unenforced. In Pakistan, the Hudood Ordinances of 1979 subsumed prosecution of rape under the category of zina, making rape extremely difficult to prove and exposing the victims to jail sentences for admitting illicit intercourse forced upon them, although these laws were amended in 2006, and again in 2016. According to human rights organizations, stoning for zina has also been carried out in Saudi Arabia.

Islamic scriptures
Muslim scholars have historically considered zinā a hudud sin, or crime against God. It is mentioned in both Quran and in the Hadiths.

Introduction and definition
The Quran deals with zinaʾ in several places. First is the Qur'anic general rule that commands Muslims not to commit zina:

In the Hadiths, the definitions of zina have been described as all the forms of sexual intercourse, penetrative or non-penetrative, outside of marriage.

Adultery and fornication

Quran
Most of the rules related to fornication, adultery and false accusations from a husband to his wife or from members of the community to chaste women, can be found in Surat an-Nur (the Light). The sura starts by giving very specific rules about punishment for zina:

Hadith

The public lashing punishment for fornication and adultery are also prescribed in Hadiths, the books most trusted in Islam after Quran, particularly in Kitab Al-Hudud.

Hadith Sahih al Bukhari, another authentic source of sunnah, has several entries which refer to death by stoning. For example,

Other hadith collections on zina between men and woman include:
 The stoning (Rajm) of a Jewish man and woman for having committed illegal sexual intercourse.
 Abu Hurairah states that the Prophet, in a case of intercourse between a young man and a married woman, sentenced the woman to stoning and the young man to flogging and banishment for a year.

Rape
 
Rape has been defined as zina al-jabr (forceful illicit sex) in the traditional Islamic texts. Few hadiths have been found regarding rape in the time of Muhammad. The most popular transmitted hadith given below indicates the ordinance of stoning for the rapist but no punishment and no requirement of four eyewitnesses for the rape victim.
	

The hadiths declare rape of a free or slave woman as zina.

View of scholars

If a confession or the four witnesses required to prove a hadd crime are not available, but rape can be proved by other means, the rapist is sentenced under the ta'zir system of judicial discretion. According to the eleventh-century Maliki jurist Ibn 'Abd al-Barr:

Homosexuality

Islamic teachings (in the hadith tradition) presume same-sex attraction, extol abstention and (in the Qur'an) condemn consummation. The Quran forbids homosexual relationships, in Al-Nisa, Al-Araf (verses 7:80–84, 11:69–83, 29:28–35 of the Quran using the story of Lot's people), and other surahs. For example,

 
In another verse, the statement of prophet Lot has been also pointed out,

Some scholars indicate this verse as the prescribed punishment for homosexuality in the Quran:

However, there are different interpretations of the last verse where who the Quran refers to as "two among you". Pakistani scholar Javed Ahmed Ghamidi sees it as a reference to premarital sexual relationships between men and women. In his opinion, the preceding Ayat of Sura Nisa deals with prostitutes of the time. He believes these rulings were temporary and were abrogated later when a functioning state was established and society was ready for permanent rulings, which came in Sura Nur, Ayat 2 and 3, prescribing flogging as a punishment for adultery. He does not see stoning as a prescribed punishment, even for married men, and considers the Hadiths quoted supporting that view to be dealing with either rape or prostitution, where the strictest punishment under Islam for spreading "fasad fil ardh", meaning corruption in the land, referring to egregious acts of defiance to the rule of law was carried out.

The Hadiths consider homosexuality as zina, and male homosexuality to be punished with death. For example, Abu Dawud states,

The discourse on homosexuality in Islam is primarily concerned with activities between men. There are, however, a few hadith mentioning homosexual behavior in women; The jurists are agreed that "there is no hadd punishment for lesbianism, because it is not zina. Rather a ta’zeer punishment must be imposed, because it is a sin..'". Although punishment for lesbianism is rarely mentioned in the histories, al-Tabari records an example of the casual execution of a pair of lesbian slavegirls in the harem of al-Hadi, in a collection of highly critical anecdotes pertaining to that Caliph's actions as ruler. Some jurists viewed sexual intercourse as possible only for an individual who possesses a phallus; hence those definitions of sexual intercourse that rely on the entry of as little as the corona of the phallus into a partner's orifice. Since women do not possess a phallus and cannot have intercourse with one another, they are, in this interpretation, physically incapable of committing zina.

Anal sex 

All Sunni Muslim jurists agree that anal sex is haram (prohibited), based on the hadith of Muhammad. In contrast, according to Twelver Shia Muslim jurists, anal sex is considered makruh (strongly disliked) but is permissible with the consent of the wife.

Many scholars point to the story of Lot in the Quran as an example of sodomy being an egregious sin. However multiple others hold the view that the destruction of Sodom and Gomorrah was not specifically due to the sodomy practiced in those towns, but as a combination of multiple transgressions. The death by stoning for people of Sodom and Gomorrah is similar to the stoning punishment stipulated for illegal heterosexual sex. There is no punishment for a man who sodomizes a woman because it is not tied to procreation. However, other jurists insist that any act of lust in which the result is the injecting of semen into another person constitutes sexual intercourse.

Sodomy often falls under that same category as sex between and unmarried man and women engaging in sexual acts. Male-male intercourse is referred to as liwat while female-female intercourse is referred to as sihaq. Both are considered reprehensible acts but there is no consensus on punishment for either. Some jurists define zināʾ exclusively as the act of unlawful vaginal penetration, hence categorizing and punishing anal penetration in different ways. Other jurists included both vaginal and anal penetration within the definition of zināʾ and hence extended the punishment of the one to the other.

Religious discourse has mostly focused on such sexual acts, which are unambiguously condemned. The Quran refers explicitly to male-male sexual relations only in the context of the story of Lot, but labels the Sodomites's actions (universally understood in the later tradition as anal intercourse) an "abomination" (female-female relations are not addressed). Reported pronouncements by Muhammad (hadith) reinforce the interdiction on male-male sodomy, although there are no reports of his ever adjudicating an actual case of such an offence; he is also quoted as condemning cross-gender behaviour for both sexes and banishing them from local places, but it is unclear to what extent this is to be understood as involving sexual relations. Several early caliphs, confronted with cases of sodomy between males, are said to have had both partners executed, by a variety of means. While taking such precedents into account, medieval jurists were unable to achieve a consensus on this issue; some legal schools prescribed capital punishment for sodomy, but others opted only for a relatively mild discretionary punishment. There was general agreement, however, that other homosexual acts (including any between females) were lesser offences, subject only to discretionary punishment.

Incest
Hadith forbids incestuous relationship (zinā bi'l-mahārim), sexual intercourse between someone who is mahram and prescribes execution as punishment.

Masturbation

Islamic scripture does not specifically mention masturbation. There are a few hadiths mentioning it, but these are classified as unreliable.

Bestiality
According to hadith, bestiality is defined under zina and its punishment is execution of the accused man or woman along with the animal.

Inclusions in the definition
Zina encompasses any sexual intercourse except that between husband and wife. It includes both extramarital sex and premarital sex, and is often translated as "fornication" in English.

Technically, zina only refers to the act of penetration, while non-penetrative sex acts outside of marriage were censured by the Prophet as that which can lead to zina.

According to Sharia, the punishment for zina varies according to whether the offender is muhsan (adult, free, Muslim and married at least once) or not muhsan (i.e. a minor, a slave, a non-Muslim or never married). A person only qualifies as muhsan if he or she meets all of the criteria. The punishment for an offender who is muhsan is stoning. (rajm); the punishment for an offender who is not muhsan is 100 lashes.

Accusation process and punishment
Islamic law requires evidence before a man or a woman can be punished for zina. These are:

A Muslim confesses to zina four separate times. However, if the confessor takes back his words before the punishment is enforced or during the punishment, he/she will be released and set free. The confessor is in fact encouraged to take back their confession.
Four free adult male Muslim witnesses of proven integrity. They must testify that they observed the couple engaged in unlawful sexual intercourse without any doubt or ambiguity. They are able to say that they saw their private parts meet "like the Kohl needle entering the Kohl bottle."
 Unlike witnesses in most other circumstances, they are neither legally nor morally obliged to testify, and in fact legal texts state that it is morally better if they don't.
 If any of the witnesses take back their testimony before the actual punishment is enforced, then the punishment will be abandoned, and the witnesses will be punished for the crime of false accusation.
 The witnesses must give their testimony at the earliest opportunity.
 If the offense is punished by stoning to death, the witnesses must throw the stones.

If a pregnant woman confesses that her baby was born from an illegal relationship then she will be subject to conviction in the Islamic courts. In cases where there are no witnesses and no confession then the woman will not receive punishment just because of pregnancy. Women can fall pregnant without committing illegal sexual intercourse. A woman could be raped or coerced. In this case, she is a victim and not the perpetrator of a crime. Therefore, she cannot be punished or even accused of misconduct merely on the strength of her falling pregnant.

The four witnesses requirement for zina is revealed by Quranic verses 24:11 through 24:13 and various hadiths. The testimony of women and non-Muslims is not admitted in cases of zina or in other hadd crimes.

Any witness to or victim of non-consensual sexual intercourse, who accuses a Muslim of zina, but fails to produce four adult, pious male eyewitnesses before a sharia court, commits the crime of false accusation (Qadhf, القذف), punishable with eighty lashes in public.

These requirements made zina virtually impossible to prove in practice. Hence, there are very few recorded examples of stoning for zina being legally carried out. In the 623-year history of the Ottoman Empire, the best-documented and most well-known pre-modern Islamic legal system, there is only one recorded example of the stoning punishment being applied for zina, when a Muslim woman and her Jewish lover were convicted of zina in 1680 and sentenced to death, the woman by stoning and the man by beheading. This was a miscarriage of justice according to the standards of Islamic law: adequate evidence was not produced, and the correct penalty for non-Muslims was 100 lashes rather than death.

Some schools of Islamic jurisprudence (fiqh) created the principle of shubha (doubt). According to this principle, if there is room for doubt in the perpetrator's mind about whether the sexual act was illegal, he or she should not receive the hadd penalty, but could receive a less severe punishment at the discretion of the judge. Jurists had varying opinions on what counted as legitimate "doubt" for this purposes. A typical example is a man who has sex with his wife's or his son's slave. This is zina - a man can lawfully have sex only with his own slave. But a man might plausibly believe that he had ownership rights over his wife's or his son's property, and so think that having sex with their slaves was legal. The Ḥanafī jurists of the Ottoman Empire applied the concept of doubt to exempt prostitution from the hadd penalty. Their rationale was that since legal sex is legitimized, in part, by payment (the dower paid by the husband to the wife upon marriage, or the purchase price of a slave), a man might plausibly believe that prostitution, which also involves a payment in return for sexual access, was legal. It is important to note that this principle did not mean that such acts were treated as legal: they remained offenses, and could be punished, but they were not liable for the hadd penalty of 100 lashes or stoning.

Sunni practice
Persons who are not muhsan (i.e. a slave, a minor, never married) are punished for zina with one hundred lashes in public.

Maliki school of Islamic jurisprudence considers pregnancy as sufficient and automatic evidence, unless there is evidence of rape. Other Sunni schools of jurisprudence rely on early Islamic scholars that state that a fetus can "sleep and stop developing for 5 years in a womb", and thus a woman who was previously married but now divorced may not have committed zina even if she delivers a baby years after her divorce. They also argue that the woman may have been forced or coerced (see section above, 'Accusation process and punishment'). The position of modern Islamic scholars varies from country to country. For example, in Malaysia which officially follows the Shafi'i fiqh, Section 23(2) through 23(4) of the Syariah (Sharia) Criminal Offences (Federal Territories) Act 1997 state,

Minimal proof for zina is still the testimony of four male eyewitnesses, even in the case of homosexual intercourse.

Prosecution of extramarital pregnancy as zina, as well as prosecution of rape victims for the crime of zina, have been the source of worldwide controversy in recent years.

Shi'a practice
Again, minimal proof for zina is the testimony of four male eyewitnesses. The Shi'is, however, also allow the testimony of women, if there is at least one male witness, testifying together with six women. All witnesses must have seen the act in its most intimate details, i.e. the penetration (like "a stick disappearing in a kohl container," as the fiqh books specify). If their testimonies do not satisfy the requirements, they can be sentenced to eighty lashes for unfounded accusation of fornication. If the accused freely admits the offense, the confession must be repeated four times, just as in Sunni practice. Pregnancy of a single woman is also sufficient evidence of her having committed zina.

Human rights controversy

The zina and rape laws of countries under Sharia law are the subjects of a global human rights debate.

Hundreds of women in Afghan jails are victims of rape or domestic violence. This has been criticized as leading to "hundreds of incidents where a woman subjected to rape, or gang rape, was eventually accused of zināʾ" and incarcerated.

In Pakistan, over 200,000 zina cases against women, under its Hudood laws, were under process at various levels in Pakistan's legal system in 2005. In addition to thousands of women in prison awaiting trial for zina-related charges, there has been a severe reluctance to even report rape because the victim fears of being charged with zina, because of the un-Islamic nature of Pakistani laws regarding sexual intercourse. Under Islamic laws, rape is not considered to be zina and no punishment falls on the victim. But rape falls under zina in Pakistani law introduced in the 1980s and sometimes becomes punishable. 

Iran has prosecuted many cases of zina, and enforced public stoning to death of those accused between 2001 and 2010.

Zina laws are one of many items of reform and secularization debate with respect to Islam. In the early 20th century, under the influence of the colonial era, many penal laws and criminal justice systems were reformed away from Sharia in Muslim-majority parts of the world. By contrast, in the second half of the 20th century, after respective independence, a number of governments including Pakistan, Morocco, Malaysia and Iran have reverted to Sharia with traditional interpretations of Islam's sacred texts. Zina and hudud laws have been re-enacted and enforced.

Contemporary human right activists refer this as a new phase in the politics of gender in Islam, the battle between forces of traditionalism and modernism in the Muslim world, and the use of religious texts of Islam through state laws to sanction and practice gender-based violence.

In contrast to human rights activists, Islamic scholars and Islamist political parties consider 'universal human rights' arguments as impositions of a non-Muslim culture on Muslim people, a disrespect of customary cultural practices and sexual codes that are central to Islam. Zina laws come under hudud seen as a crime against Allah; the Islamists refer to this pressure and proposals to reform zina and other laws as contrary to Islam. Attempts by international human rights to reform religious laws and codes of Islam has become the Islamist rallying platforms during political campaigns.

In popular culture
 The Stoning of Soraya M. A 2008 Persian-language American drama film adapted from French-Iranian journalist Freidoune Sahebjam's 1990 book La Femme Lapidée, regarding to a mistaken-punishment of a false zina accusation.

See also
 Islamic criminal jurisprudence
 Islamic family jurisprudence
 Islamic sexual jurisprudence
 Modesty in Islam
 Namus
 Nikah mut‘ah
 Nikah urfi
 Ma malakat aymanukum and sex
 Rajm
 Repentance in Islam
 Sex and the law

References

Further reading
 Calder, Norman, Colin Imber, and R. Gleave. Islamic Jurisprudence in the Classical Era. Cambridge, U.K.: Cambridge UP, 2010.
 Johnson, Toni, and Lauren Vriens, "Islam: Governing Under Sharia.", Council on Foreign Relations. Council on Foreign Relations, Inc., 24 Oct. 2011. Web. 19 Nov. 2011. 
 Karamah: Muslim Women Lawyers for Human Rights, "Zina, Rape, and Islamic Law: An Islamic Legal Analysis of the Rape Laws in Pakistan." 26 Nov. 2011. 
 Khan, Shahnaz. "Locating The Feminist Voice: The Debate On The Zina Ordinance." Feminist Studies 30.3 (2004): 660–685. Academic Search Complete. Web. 28 Nov. 2011.
 McAuliffe, Jane Dammen. The Cambridge Companion to the Qurʼān. Cambridge, UK: Cambridge UP, 2006
 Peters, R. "Zinā or Zināʾ (a.)." Encyclopaedia of Islam, Second Edition. Edited by: P. Bearman;, Th. Bianquis;, C.E. Bosworth;, E. van Donzel; and W.P. Heinrichs. Brill, 2011. Brill Online. UNIVERSITY OF TEXAS AT AUSTIN. 17 November 2011
 Peters, R. "The Islamization of criminal law: A comparative analysis", in WI, xxxiv (1994), 246–74.
 Quraishi, Asifa. "Islamic Legal Analysis of Zina Punishment of Bariya Ibrahim Magazu, Zamfara, Nigeria." Muslim Women's League. Muslim Women's League, 20 Jan. 2001

External links
 Zina prosecution in Katsina State, Northern Nigeria Proceedings and Judgments in the Amina Lawal Case (2002)
 Sharia Law
 Articles and Opinions: American Muslims need to speak out against violations of Islamic Shariah law (Asma Society)
 , Hisham M. Ramadan
 Afghanistan: Surge in Women Jailed for ‘Moral Crimes’ Zina in Afghanistan, Human Rights Watch (May 21, 2013)
 Mukhtar Mai - history of a rape case, Pakistan, BBC News
 Fate of another royal found guilty of adultery Zina in Saudi Arabia, The Independent (2009), UK

Adultery in law
Arabic words and phrases in Sharia
Islamic criminal jurisprudence
Islamic terminology
Marriage and religion
Sexual abstinence and religion
Sexuality in Islam
Sharia legal terminology
Sin
Women's rights in Islam